Aeneolamia lepidior is a species of Cicadomorpha in the froghopper family (Cercopidae). It was first recognized as a species in 1897 by Fowler. It has been reported in Costa Rica, Panama, and Colombia.

References 

Cercopidae
Hemiptera of Central America
Insects described in 1897